Princeton is a municipality with a borough form of government in Mercer County, in the U.S. state of New Jersey. It was established on January 1, 2013, through the consolidation of the Borough of Princeton and Princeton Township, both of which are now defunct. As of the 2020 United States census, the borough's population was 30,681, an increase of 2,109 (+7.4%) from the 2010 census combined count of 28,572.

Princeton was founded before the American Revolutionary War. The borough is the home of Princeton University, which bears its name and moved to the community in 1756 from the educational institution's previous location in Newark. Although its association with the university is primarily what makes Princeton a college town, other important institutions in the area include the Institute for Advanced Study, Westminster Choir College, Princeton Plasma Physics Laboratory, Princeton Theological Seminary, Opinion Research Corporation, Bristol-Myers Squibb, Siemens Corporate Research, SRI International, FMC Corporation, The Robert Wood Johnson Foundation, Amrep, Church and Dwight, Berlitz International, and Dow Jones & Company.

Princeton is roughly equidistant from New York City and Philadelphia. It is close to many major highways that serve both cities (e.g., Interstate 95 and U.S. Route 1), and receives major television and radio broadcasts from each. It is also close to Trenton, New Jersey's capital city, New Brunswick and Edison.

The New Jersey governor's official residence has been in Princeton since 1945, when Morven in what was then Princeton Borough became the first Governor's mansion. In 1982, it was replaced by the larger Drumthwacket, a colonial mansion located in the former Township, but not all have actually lived in these houses. Morven became a museum property of the New Jersey Historical Society.

Princeton was ranked 15th of the top 100 towns in the United States to Live In by Money magazine in 2005.

Throughout much of its history, the community was composed of two separate municipalities: a township and a borough. The central borough was completely surrounded by the township. The borough seceded from the township in 1894 in a dispute over school taxes; the two municipalities later formed the Princeton Public Schools, and some other public services were conducted together before they were reunited into a single Princeton in January 2013.  Princeton Borough contained Nassau Street, the main commercial street, most of the university campus, and incorporated most of the urban area until the postwar suburbanization. The borough and township had roughly equal populations.

History

Early history

The Lenape Native Americans were the earliest identifiable inhabitants of the Princeton area.

Europeans settled into the area in the late part of the 17th century, arriving from Delaware to settle West Jersey, and from New York to settle East Jersey, with the site destined to become Princeton being amid the wilderness between these two boroughs.  The first European to find his home in the boundaries of the future municipality was Henry Greenland. He built his house in 1683 along with a tavern, where representatives of West and East Jersey met to set the boundaries between the two provinces.  Greenland's son-in-law Daniel Brimson inhabited the area by 1690, and left property in a will dated 1696.

Then, Princeton was known only as part of nearby Stony Brook. Nathaniel Fitz Randolph, a native of the town, attested in his private journal on December 28, 1758, that Princeton was named in 1724 upon the making/construction of the first house in the area by James Leonard, who first referred to the community as Princetown when describing the location of his large estate in his diary. The community was  later known by a variety of names, including: Princetown, Prince's Town and finally Princeton. The name Princeton was first used in 1724 and became common within the subsequent decade. Although there is no official documentary backing, the municipality is said to be named after King William III, Prince William of Orange of the House of Nassau. Another theory suggests that the name came from a large land-owner named Henry Prince, the son-in-law of a well-known English merchant, but no evidence backs this contention. A royal prince seems a more likely eponym for the settlement, as three nearby towns had names for royalty: Kingston, Queenstown (in the vicinity of the intersection of Nassau and Harrison Streets) and Princessville (Lawrence Township).

Princeton was described by William Edward Schenck in 1850 as having attained "no very considerable size" until the establishment of the College of New Jersey in the town. When Richard Stockton, one of the founders of the township, died in 1709 he left his estate to his sons, who helped to expand property and the population. Based on the 1880 United States Census, the population of Princeton comprised 3,209 persons (not including students). Local population has expanded from the nineteenth century. According to the 2010 Census, Princeton Borough had 12,307 inhabitants, while Princeton Township had 16,265. The numbers have become stagnant; since the arrival of the College of New Jersey, now Princeton University, in 1756, the town's population spikes every year during the fall and winter and drops significantly over the course of the summer.

Revolution
In the pivotal Battle of Princeton in January 1777, George Washington forced the British to evacuate southern New Jersey. After the victory, Princeton hosted the first Legislature under the State Constitution to decide the State's seal, Governor and organization of its government. In addition, two of the original signers of the Declaration of Independence—Richard Stockton and John Witherspoon lived in Princeton. Princetonians honored their citizens' legacy by naming two streets in the downtown area after them.

On January 10, 1938, Henry Ewing Hale called for a group of citizens to establish a "Historical Society of Princeton." Later the Bainbridge House, constructed in 1766 by Job Stockton, would be dedicated for this purpose. Previously the house was used once for a meeting of Continental Congress in 1783, a general office, and as the Princeton Public Library. The House is owned by Princeton University and is leased to the Princeton Historical Society for one dollar per year. The house has kept its original staircase, flooring and paneled walls. Around 70% of the house has been unaltered. Aside from safety features such as wheelchair access and electrical work, the house has been restored to its original look.

Government history
During the most stirring events in its history, Princeton was a wide spot in the road; the boundary between Somerset County and Middlesex County ran right through Princeton, along the high road between New York and Philadelphia, now Nassau Street. When Mercer County was formed in 1838, part of West Windsor Township was added to the portion of Montgomery Township which was included in the new county, and made into Princeton Township; the area between the southern boundary of the former Borough and the Delaware and Raritan Canal was added to Princeton Township in 1853. Princeton Borough became a separate municipality in 1894.

In the early nineteenth century, New Jersey boroughs had been quasi-independent subdivisions chartered within existing townships that did not have full autonomy. Princeton Borough received such a charter in 1813, as part of Montgomery and West Windsor Townships; it continued to be part of Princeton Township until the Borough Act of 1894, which required each township to form a single school district; rather than do so, Princeton Borough petitioned to be separated. (The two Princetons combined their public school systems in the decades before municipal consolidation.) Two minor boundary changes united the then site of the Princeton Hospital and of the Princeton Regional High School inside the Borough, in 1928 and 1951 respectively.

Geography
According to the U.S. Census Bureau, Princeton had a total area of 18.41 square miles (47.69 km2), including 17.95 square miles (46.48 km2) of land and 0.47 square miles (1.21 km2) of water (2.53%).

Cedar Grove, Port Mercer, Princeton Basin, and Jugtown are unincorporated communities that have been absorbed into Greater Princeton over the years, but still maintain their own community identity.

Princeton borders the municipalities of Hopewell Township, Lawrence and West Windsor Townships in Mercer County; Plainsboro Township and South Brunswick Township in Middlesex County; and Franklin Township and Montgomery Township in Somerset County.

United States Postal ZIP codes for Princeton include 08540, 08541 (Educational Testing Service), 08542 (largely the old Borough), 08543 (PO boxes), and 08544 (the University).

Climate
Under the Köppen climate classification, Princeton falls within either a hot-summer humid continental climate (Dfa) if the  isotherm is used or a humid subtropical climate (Cfa) if the  isotherm is used. During the summer months, episodes of extreme heat and humidity can occur with heat index values ≥ 100 °F (≥ 38 °C). On average, the wettest month of the year is July which corresponds with the annual peak in thunderstorm activity. During the winter months, episodes of extreme cold and wind can occur with wind chill values < 0 °F (< −18 °C). The plant hardiness zone at the Princeton Municipal Court is 6b with an average annual extreme minimum air temperature of −0.9 °F (−18.3 °C).

Ecology
According to the A. W. Kuchler U.S. potential natural vegetation types, Princeton, New Jersey, would have an Appalachian Oak (104) vegetation type with an Eastern Hardwood Forest (25) vegetation form.

Demographics

2010 census
As of the 2010 United States census, the borough and township had a combined population of 28,572.

According to the website Data USA, Princeton has a population of 30,168 people, of which 85% are US citizens. The ethnic composition of the population is 20,393 White residents (67.6%), 4,636 Asian residents (15.4%), 2,533 Hispanic residents (8.4%), 1,819 Black residents (6.03%), and 618 Two+ residents (2.05%). The most common foreign languages are Chinese (1,800 speakers), Spanish (1,429 speakers), and French (618 speakers), but compared to other places, Princeton has a relatively high number of speakers of Scandinavian languages (425 speakers), Italian (465 speakers), and German (1,000 speakers).

Government and politics

Local government
Princeton is governed under the Borough form of New Jersey municipal government, which is used in 218 municipalities (of the 564) statewide, making it the most common form of government in New Jersey. The governing body is comprised of the Mayor and the Borough Council, with all positions elected at-large on a partisan basis as part of the November general election. The Mayor is elected directly by the voters to a four-year term of office. The Borough Council is comprised of six members elected to serve three-year terms on a staggered basis, with two seats coming up for election each year in a three-year cycle. The Borough form of government used by Princeton is a "weak mayor / strong council" government in which council members act as the legislative body with the mayor presiding at meetings and voting only in the event of a tie. The mayor can veto ordinances subject to an override by a two-thirds majority vote of the council. The mayor makes committee and liaison assignments for council members, and most appointments are made by the mayor with the advice and consent of the council.

The Mayor is elected directly by the voters to a four-year term of office, serves as Princeton's chief executive officer and nominates appointees to various boards and commissions subject to approval of the council. The Mayor presides at Council meetings and votes in the case of a tie or a few other specific cases. The Council consists of six members elected to serve three-year terms on a staggered basis, with two seats coming up for election each year in a three-year cycle. The council has administrative powers and is the policy-making body for Princeton. The Council approves appointments made by the Mayor. Council Members serve on various boards and committees and act as liaisons to certain Departments, Committees or Boards.

, the mayor of Princeton is Democrat Mark Freda, who is serving a four-year term expiring on December 31, 2023. Members of the Princeton Council are Council President Leticia Fraga (D, 2023), David F. Cohen (D, 2023), Eve Niedergang (D, 2024), Michelle Pirone Lambros (D, 2022), Leighton Newlin (D, 2024) and Mia Sacks (D, 2022).

In 2018, Princeton had an average property tax bill of $19,388, the highest in the county, compared to an average bill of $8,767 statewide.

Merger of borough and township
People in the township tried unsuccessfully to merge borough and township in a struggle that lasted nearly fifty years. The first failed attempt to consolidate borough and township was made in 1953, with 63% of township voters in favor of a merger and 57% of borough voters opposed. Subsequent attempts were voted down by borough residents, in large part due to different zoning needs of the densely populated borough versus the more widely-spaced properties of the township (surrounding the borough). An attempt to consolidate in 1979 passed with 70% support in the township but failed in the borough by 33 votes, a result that was upheld after a recount. Although township voters again supported a 1996 merger referendum by an almost 3-1 margin, about 57% of borough voters rejected the consolidation proposal, marking the sixth such failure.

The residents of both the Borough of Princeton and the Township of Princeton voted on November 8, 2011, to merge the two municipalities into one.  Student voters were active throughout the campaign and likely contributed strongly to the measure passing. In Princeton Borough 1,385 voted for and 902 voted against, while in Princeton Township 3,542 voted for and 604 voted against. Proponents of the merger asserted that when the merger is completed the new municipality of Princeton would save $3.2 million as a result of some scaled down services including layoffs of 15 government workers including 9 police officers (however the measure itself does not mandate such layoffs). Opponents of the measure challenged the findings of a report citing a cost savings as unsubstantiated, expressed concerns about differing zoning needs between borough and township, and noted that voter representation would be reduced in a smaller government structure. The merger was the first in the state since 1997, when Pahaquarry Township voted to consolidate with Hardwick Township The consolidation took effect on January 1, 2013.

Federal, state and county representation
Princeton is located in the 12th Congressional District and is part of New Jersey's 16th state legislative district. Prior to the 2011 reapportionment following the 2010 Census, the former Princeton Borough and Princeton Township had both been in the 15th state legislative district.

Politics
As of March 2011, there were a total of 18,049 registered voters in Princeton (a sum of the former borough and township's voters), of which 9,184 (50.9%) were registered as Democrats, 2,140 (11.9%) were registered as Republicans and 6,703 (37.1%) were registered as unaffiliated. There were 22 voters registered as Libertarians or Greens.

In both the 2016 and 2020 presidential elections, the Democratic nommiee received over 80% of the vote. In the 2012 presidential election, Democrat Barack Obama received 75.4% of the vote (9,461 cast), ahead of Republican Mitt Romney with 23.0% (2,882 votes), and other candidates with 1.6% (205 votes), among the 14,752 ballots cast by the municipality's 20,328 registered voters (2,204 ballots were spoiled), for a turnout of 72.6%.

In the 2013 gubernatorial election, Democrat Barbara Buono received 58.8% of the vote (4,172 cast), ahead of Republican Chris Christie with 39.2% (2,780 votes), and other candidates with 2.0% (145 votes), among the 7,279 ballots cast by the municipality's 18,374 registered voters (182 ballots were spoiled), for a turnout of 39.6%.

Education

Colleges and universities

Princeton University, one of the world's most prominent research universities, is a dominant feature of the community. Established in 1746 as the College of New Jersey and relocated to Princeton ten years later, Princeton University's main campus has its historic center on Nassau Street and stretches south from there. Its James Forrestal satellite campus is located in Plainsboro Township, and some playing fields lie within adjacent West Windsor Township. Princeton University is often featured at or near the top of various national and global university rankings, topping the 2019 list of U.S. News & World Report.

Westminster Choir College, a school of music presently owned by Rider University, was established in Princeton in 1932. Before relocating to Princeton, the school resided in Dayton, Ohio, and then briefly in Ithaca, New York.

Princeton Theological Seminary, the first and oldest seminary in America of the Presbyterian Church (USA), has its main academic campus in Princeton, with residential housing located just outside of Princeton in West Windsor Township.

The Institute for Advanced Study maintains extensive land holdings (the "Institute Woods") there covering .

Mercer County Community College in West Windsor is a two-year public college serving Princeton residents and all those from Mercer County.

Primary and secondary schools

Public schools

The Princeton Public Schools serve students in pre-kindergarten through twelfth grade. Students from Cranbury Township attend the district's high school as part of a sending/receiving relationship. As of the 2020–21 school year, the district, comprised of six schools, had an enrollment of 3,740 students and 341.0 classroom teachers (on an FTE basis), for a student–teacher ratio of 11.0:1. Schools in the district (with 2020–21 enrollment data from the National Center for Education Statistics) are 
Community Park School with 332 students in grades K-5, 
Johnson Park School with 329 students in grades PreK-5, 
Littlebrook School with 342 students in grades K-5, 
Riverside School with 289 students in grades PreK-5, 
Princeton Middle School  with 803 students in grades 6-8 and 
Princeton High School with 1,555 students in grades 9-12.

New Jersey Monthly magazine ranked Princeton High School as the 20th best high school in New Jersey in its 2018 rankings of the "Top Public High Schools" in New Jersey. The school was also ranked as the 10th best school in New Jersey by U.S. News & World Report.  Niche ranked Princeton High School as the 47th best public high school in America in its "2021 Best Public High Schools in America" rankings.

In the early 1990s, redistricting occurred between the Community Park and Johnson Park School districts, as the population within both districts had increased due to residential development. Concerns were also raised about the largely white, wealthy student population attending Johnson Park (JP) and the more racially and economically diverse population at Community Park (CP). As a result of the redistricting, portions of the affluent Western Section neighborhood were redistricted to CP, and portions of the racially and economically diverse John Witherspoon neighborhood were redistricted to JP.

The Princeton Charter School (grades K–8) operates under a charter granted by the Commissioner of the New Jersey Department of Education. The school is a public school that operates independently of the Princeton Regional Schools, and is funded on a per student basis by locally raised tax revenues.

Eighth grade students from all of Mercer County are eligible to apply to attend the high school programs offered by the Mercer County Technical Schools, a county-wide vocational school district that offers full-time career and technical education at its Health Sciences Academy, STEM Academy and Academy of Culinary Arts, with no tuition charged to students for attendance.

Private schools
Private schools located in Princeton include The Lewis School of Princeton, Princeton Day School, Princeton Friends School, Hun School of Princeton, and Princeton International School of Mathematics and Science (PRISMS).

St. Paul's Catholic School (pre-school to 8th grade) founded in 1878, is the oldest and only coeducational Catholic school, joining Princeton Academy of the Sacred Heart (K–8, all male) and Stuart Country Day School of the Sacred Heart (coed for Pre-K, and all-female K–12), which operate under the supervision of the Roman Catholic Diocese of Trenton.

Schools that are outside of Princeton but have Princeton addresses include the Wilberforce School, Chapin School in Lawrence Township, Princeton Junior School in Lawrence Township, the French-American School of Princeton, the Laurel School of Princeton, the Waldorf School of Princeton, YingHua International School, Princeton Latin Academy in Hopewell, Princeton Montessori School in Montgomery Township, Eden Institute in West Windsor Township, and the now-defunct American Boychoir School in Plainsboro Township.

Public libraries
The Princeton Public Library's current facility on Witherspoon Street was opened in April 2004 as part of the ongoing downtown redevelopment project and replaced a building dating from 1966. The library itself was founded in 1909.

Miscellaneous education
The Princeton Community Japanese Language School teaches weekend Japanese classes for Japanese citizen children abroad to the standard of the Ministry of Education, Culture, Sports, Science and Technology (MEXT), and it also has classes for people with Japanese as a second language. The main office of the school is in Princeton although the office used on Sundays is in Memorial Hall at Rider University in Lawrence Township in Mercer County. Courses are taught at Memorial Hall at Rider University.

The Princeton Learning Cooperative provides support for student-directed learning as "a hybrid of homeschooling and school" for teens.

Transportation

Roads and highways

Several major roads pass through Princeton. U.S. Route 206 and Route 27 pass through, along with County Routes 583, 526/571 (commonly known as Washington Road) and 533.

Other major roads that are accessible outside the municipality include U.S. Route 1 (in Lawrence Township, West Windsor and South Brunswick), Interstate 287 (in Franklin Township), Interstate 295 (in Lawrence Township), and the New Jersey Turnpike/Interstate 95 (in South Brunswick). The closest Turnpike exits are Interchange 8A in Monroe Township, Interchange 8 in East Windsor, and Interchange 7A in Robbinsville Township.

A number of proposed highways around Princeton have been canceled. The Somerset Freeway (I-95) was to pass just outside the municipality before ending in Hopewell (to the south) and Franklin (to the north). This project was canceled in 1980. Route 92 was supposed to remedy the lack of limited-access highways to the greater Princeton area. The road would have started at Route 1 near Ridge Road in South Brunswick and ended at Exit 8A of the Turnpike. However, that project was cancelled in 2006.

Public transportation

Princeton is roughly equidistant from New York City and Philadelphia. Since the 19th century, it has been connected by rail to both of these cities by the Princeton Branch rail line to the nearby Princeton Junction station on Amtrak's Northeast Corridor.  The Princeton train station was moved from under Blair Hall to a more southerly location on University Place in 1918, and was moved further southeast in 2013. Commuting to New York from Princeton became commonplace after the Second World War. While the Amtrak ride time is similar to New York and to Philadelphia, the commuter-train ride to New York—via NJ Transit's Northeast Corridor Line—is generally much faster than the equivalent train ride to Philadelphia, which involves a transfer to SEPTA trains in Trenton. NJ Transit provides shuttle service between the Princeton and Princeton Junction stations;  the train is locally called the "Dinky", and has also been known as the "PJ&B" (for "Princeton Junction and Back").  Two train cars, or sometimes just one, are used.

NJ Transit provides bus service to Trenton on the 606 route and local service on route 605.

Coach USA Suburban Transit operates frequent daily service to midtown NYC on the 100 route, and weekday rush-hour service to downtown NYC on the 600 route.

Princeton and Princeton University provide the FreeB and Tiger Transit local bus services.

Air

Sister cities

 Colmar, France
 Pettoranello del Molise, Italy

Notable people

People who were born in, residents of, or otherwise closely associated with Princeton include:
Note: this list does not include people whose only time in Princeton was as a student. Only selected faculty are shown, whose notability extends beyond their field into popular culture. See Faculty and Alumni lists above.

 Matthew Abelson, hammered dulcimer player
 Robert Adrain (1775–1843), Irish-born mathematician known for his formulation of the method of least squares
 George Akerlof (born 1940), economist who shared the 2001 Nobel Memorial Prize in Economic Sciences
 Archibald Alexander (1772–1851), Presbyterian theologian and first professor at the Princeton Theological Seminary
 James Waddel Alexander (1804–1859), Presbyterian minister and theologian
 Joseph Addison Alexander (1809–1860), biblical scholar
 William Cowper Alexander (1806–1874), lawyer, politician and insurance executive, who served as President of the New Jersey Senate and as President of the Equitable Life Assurance Society
 Svetlana Alliluyeva (1926–2011), daughter of Joseph Stalin, defected to United States and lived in Princeton
 Lylah M. Alphonse (born 1972), journalist
 Saul Amarel (1928–2002), professor of computer science at Rutgers University, best known for his pioneering work in artificial intelligence
 Trey Anastasio (born 1964), of the band Phish, lived in Princeton with his family and attended Princeton Day School
 William H. Angoff (–1993), research scientist who worked for the Educational Testing Service, where he helped improve the SAT
 James Isbell Armstrong (1919–2013), academic who was President of Middlebury College from 1963 to 1975
 Milton Babbitt (1916–2011), composer and Princeton University professor
 William Bainbridge (1774–1833), Commodore in the United States Navy
 Molly Bang (born 1943), children's book illustrator
 George Barna (born 1954), founder of The Barna Group, a market research firm specializing in studying the religious beliefs and behavior of Americans
 Chris Barron (born 1968), lead singer of the Spin Doctors
 Charles Clinton Beatty (1800–1880), Presbyterian minister, seminary founder and academic philanthropist
 Saul Bellow (1915–2005), author and Princeton University professor
 Paul Benacerraf (born 1931), philosopher and Princeton University professor
 Peter Benchley (1940–2006), author and screenwriter, Jaws, The Island, lived and died in Princeton
 Wendy Benchley (born 1941), marine and environmental conservation advocate and former Princeton Borough councilwoman who was the wife of author Peter Benchley
 Ed Berger (1949–2017), librarian, discographer, author, editor, historian, photographer, educator, jazz producer and record label owner
 Stanley S. Bergen Jr. (1929–2019), physician, university president, and professor, who was President of the University of Medicine and Dentistry of New Jersey from 1971 to 1998
 Laurie Berkner (born 1969), musician best known for her work as a children's musical artist
 Geoffrey Berman (born 1959), lawyer currently serving as the Interim United States Attorney for the Southern District of New York
 Garrett Birkhoff (1911–1996), mathematician best known for his work in lattice theory
 Cyril Edwin Black (1915–1989), professor of history and international affairs, specializing in the modern history of Eastern Europe and, in particular, Russian history since 1700
 Michael Bradley (born 1987), soccer player
 Avery Brooks (born 1948), actor, singer and educator
 George Harold Brown (1908–1987), research engineer at RCA, lived in Princeton
 Aaron Burr (1756–1836), third Vice President of the United States (under Thomas Jefferson); killed Alexander Hamilton in a duel, grew up in Princeton and is buried there
 Aaron Burr Sr. (1715–1757), co-founder of Princeton University and its second president
 Lesley Bush (born 1947), diver who represented the United States at the 1964 Summer Olympics in Tokyo, where she received a gold medal in the 10 meter platform
 Sim Cain (born 1963), drummer for Rollins Band, grew up in Princeton
 Marsha Campbell (born 1946), politician who served in the Missouri House of Representatives
 Melisa Can (born 1984 as Michelle Marie Campbell), professional basketball player at the power forward position who plays for Adana ASKİ
 Mary Chapin Carpenter (born 1958), country/folk singer, born and grew up in Princeton
 William Ashburner Cattell (1863–1920), civil engineer and railroad company president; born in Princeton
 Damien Chazelle (born 1985), film director, producer, and writer. Youngest winner of the Academy Award for Best Director
 Blair Clark (1917–2000), journalist and political activist who was general manager / vice president of CBS News and Senator Eugene McCarthy's national campaign manager for the 1968 presidential nomination
 Patrick Clark (1955–1998), chef
 Frances Folsom Cleveland (1864–1947), First Lady, died in and is buried in Princeton
 Grover Cleveland (1837–1908), 22nd and 24th President of the United States, retired to, died in, and buried in Princeton
 Ruth Cleveland (1891–1904), daughter of Grover and Frances Cleveland born between Cleveland's two terms in office,  died at age 12 and is buried at Princeton Cemetery
 Chris Conley (born 1980), lead singer of Saves the Day, born and grew up in Princeton
 Archibald Crossley (1896–1985), pollster, statistician and pioneer in public opinion research
 John Crowley (born 1967), biotechnology executive and entrepreneur and the chairman and CEO of Amicus Therapeutics
 Whitney Darrow Jr. (1909–1999), cartoonist at The New Yorker
 Jon Drezner, architect and designer
 Howard Duffield (1854–1941), Presbyterian minister
 Freeman Dyson (1923–2020), theoretical physicist and fellow at the Institute for Advanced Study
 Jonathan Edwards (1703–1758), Congregationalist Church theologian, Princeton University's third president
 Albert Einstein (1879–1955), physicist, fellow at the Institute for Advanced Study
 Maria (Maja) Einstein (1881–1951), German Romanist and the younger sister of Albert Einstein
 T. S. Eliot (1888–1965), author
 Elmer William Engstrom (1901–1984), President and CEO of RCA
 Daniel Errico, children's book author and children's media content creator who is the creator and executive producer of Hulu's kids TV series The Bravest Knight
 Katherine Ettl (–1993), sculptor best known for her monumental bronzes
 Charles Evered (born 1964), playwright, screenwriter and director, resident of Princeton
 Henry B. Eyring (born 1933), Second Counselor in the First Presidency of the Church of Jesus Christ of Latter-day Saints and president of Ricks College, born in Princeton
 Robert Fagles (1933–2008), professor, poet, and academic, best known for his many translations of ancient Greek and Roman classics, especially his translations of the epic poems of Homer
 Mervin Field (1921–2015), public opinion pollster whose career in polling began with a poll of Princeton High School students in a class election
 Abner S. Flagg (1851–1923), businessman and politicians, served in the Wisconsin State Assembly and as Mayor of Edgerton, Wisconsin
 Richard Ford (born 1944), writer, taught at Princeton University, wrote several books set in a fictionalized Haddam, New Jersey, based in part on Princeton
 Colette Fu, photographer, book artist and paper engineer
 N. Howell Furman (1892–1965), professor of analytical chemistry who helped develop the electrochemical uranium separation process as part of the Manhattan Project
 George Gallup (1901–1984), statistician and creator of the Gallup poll, lived and is buried in Princeton
 George Gallup Jr. (1930–2011), pollster and author
 Donald Gips (born 1960), Chief Domestic Policy Advisor to Vice President Al Gore and appointed United States Ambassador to South Africa by Barack Obama
 Kurt Gödel (1906–1978), Austrian-American logician, mathematician and philosopher, fellow at the Institute for Advanced Study
 Caroline Gordon (1895–1981), novelist, lived in Princeton from 1956 to 1975 
 Michael Graves (1934–2015), architect, lived and worked in Princeton
 Fred Greenstein (1930–2018), political scientist
 Ariela Gross (born 1965), historian who is the John B. and Alice R. Sharp Professor of Law and History at the University of Southern California Gould School of Law
 Hallett Johnson (1888–1968), career diplomat who served as the United States Ambassador to Costa Rica
 Chris Harford, self-taught singer, songwriter, guitarist and painter
 Ethan Hawke (born 1970), actor
 Sarah Hay (born 1987), actress and ballet dancer with the Semperoper in Dresden
 Joseph Hewes (1730–1779), signer of the United States Declaration of Independence, born in Princeton
 Charles Hodge (1797–1878), theologian and Principal of Princeton Theological Seminary 
 Herbert Huffman (1905–1968), musician and choir director, founder of the American Boychoir School
 Harold L. Humes (1926–1992), novelist who was the originator of The Paris Review literary magazine
 Guy Hutchinson (born 1974),  author, broadcaster, theme park historian and comedian
 Micky James (born 1993), singer, songwriter and musician
 Barbara Piasecka Johnson (1937–2013), Polish-born American humanitarian, philanthropist, art connoisseur and collector
 Robert Wood Johnson II (1893–1968), Chairman of Johnson & Johnson, and his wife Margaret, lived in Morven
 John Katzenbach (born 1950), author of popular fiction
 George F. Kennan (1904–2005), diplomat, historian, fellow at the Institute for Advanced Study
 Gina Kolata (born 1948), reporter for The New York Times
 Paul Krugman (born 1953), Nobel Prize winner, economist, professor of economics and international affairs at Princeton University
 Matt Lalli (born 1986), professional lacrosse player for the Boston Cannons of Major League Lacrosse
 Chang-Rae Lee (born 1965), writer, Princeton University professor
 Arthur Lithgow (1915–2004), actor, director, educator, and managing director of Princeton's McCarter Theatre
 John Lithgow (born 1945), actor, lived in Princeton in his late teens
 Emily Mann (born 1952), artistic director of Princeton's McCarter Theatre
 Barbara Majeski (born 1973), television personality and lifestyle expert
 Thomas Mann (1875–1955), author
 Henry Martin (1925 2020), cartoonist at The New Yorker, lived and worked in Princeton
 Alpheus T. Mason (1899–1989), legal scholar and biographer
 John McPhee (born 1931), writer, lives in Princeton
 Rachel Lambert Mellon (1910–2014), horticulturalist, gardener, philanthropist and art collector
 Lyle and Erik Menendez (born 1968 and born 1970), two brothers convicted of murdering their parents in 1989
 Steve "Buddy" Miller (born 1952), Nashville session musician, grew up in Princeton and attended Princeton High School
 E. Spencer Miller (1817–1879), Dean of the University of Pennsylvania Law School
 Jeannette Mirsky (1903–1987), author who was awarded a Guggenheim Fellowship in 1947 for her biographical writings on the history of exploration
 Toni Morrison (1931–2019), author, Nobel Laureate, Princeton University professor
 Paul Muldoon (born 1951), Irish poet
 Jeanette Mundt (born 1982), painter, best known for her works in the 2019 Whitney Biennial
 John Forbes Nash Jr. (1928–2015), mathematician, Nobel Prize winner, subject of A Beautiful Mind, Princeton University professor
 Charles Neider (1915–2001), author, Twain scholar; resided on Southern Way 
 John von Neumann (1903−1957), Hungarian-American mathematician at Princeton University and Institute for Advanced Study
 Bebe Neuwirth (born 1958), actress, grew up in Princeton
 Joyce Carol Oates (born 1938), writer, Princeton University professor
 John O'Hara (1905–1970), author, lived in and is buried in Princeton
 Charles Smith Olden (1799–1876), Governor of New Jersey during the American Civil War
 A. Dayton Oliphant (1887–1963), Associate Justice of the New Jersey Supreme Court from 1945 to 1946, and from 1948 to 1957
 Gregory Olsen (born 1945), entrepreneur, engineer and scientist who, in October 2005, became the third private citizen to make a self-funded trip to the International Space Station
 J. Robert Oppenheimer (1904–1967), theoretical physicist, director of the Institute for Advanced Study
 Alicia Ostriker (born 1937), poet and scholar who writes Jewish feminist poetry
 Jeremiah P. Ostriker (born 1937), astronomer
 Unity Phelan (born 1994 or 1995), ballet dancer who joined the New York City Ballet in 2013 and was promoted to soloist in 2017
 John Popper (born 1967), lead singer of the band Blues Traveler
 Andy Potts (born 1976), triathlete who represented the United States in triathlon at the 2004 Summer Olympics
 Pete Raymond (born 1947), former rower who competed in the 1968 Summer Olympics and in the 1972 Summer Olympics
 Christopher Reeve (1952–2004), actor, grew up in Princeton, attended Princeton Day School
 Paul Robeson (1898–1976), singer, actor, athlete, civil rights activist, born and raised in Princeton
 Arnold Roth (born 1929), cartoonist, longtime Princeton resident
 William E. Schluter (1927–2018), politician who served in the New Jersey General Assembly and the New Jersey Senate
 Ralph Schoenstein (1933–2006), writer, lived in Princeton up to his death
 John Schneider (born 1980), professional baseball coach for the Toronto Blue Jays
 Bill Schroeder (born 1958), Major League Baseball player for the Milwaukee Brewers and California Angels, Brewers commentator for Fox Sports Wisconsin
 Roger Sessions (1896–1985), composer, Princeton University professor
 Tsutomu Shimomura (born 1964), Japanese-American scientist and computer security expert
 Andrew Shue (born 1967), actor and professional soccer player, grew up in northern New Jersey with sister, actress Elisabeth Shue, lives in Princeton
 Michael Showalter (born 1970), comedian, actor, writer, and director, born in Princeton, attended Princeton High School
 Barbara Boggs Sigmund (1939–1990), mayor of Princeton
 Peter Singer (born 1946), moral philosopher, bioethicist and Princeton University professor
 Shelley Smith (born 1952), actress
 Tom Snow (born 1947), musician
 Gennady Spirin (born 1948), artist
 Betsey Stockton (–1865), educator and missionary, manumitted from slavery and later retired to and died in Princeton
 John P. Stockton (1826–1900), U.S. senator from New Jersey, lived in Princeton
 Richard Stockton (1730–1781), signer of the United States Declaration of Independence, lived in and is buried in Princeton
 Richard Stockton (1764–1828), U.S. senator from New Jersey, lived in Princeton
 Robert F. Stockton (1795–1866), United States Navy commodore, U.S. Military Governor of California, lived in Princeton
 Janet Sorg Stoltzfus, (1931–2004), educator, who established the Ta'iz Cooperative School, the first non-religious school in north Yemen.
 Robert Stone (born 1958, class of 1976), director and documentary filmmaker
 Jon Tenney (born 1961), actor, born and raised in Princeton
 Paul Tulane (1801–1887), benefactor and namesake of Tulane University
 Immanuel Velikovsky (1895–1979), controversial theorist and acquaintance of Albert Einstein
 Brandon Wagner (born 1995), professional baseball player
 Susie Ione Brown Waxwood (1902–2006), clubwoman and YWCA official in Princeton
 Andrew Wiles (born 1953), mathematician who proved Fermat's Last Theorem, Princeton University professor
 Woodrow Wilson (1856–1924), 28th President of the United States, 13th president of Princeton University, Governor of New Jersey
 John Witherspoon (1723–1794), signer of the United States Declaration of Independence, president of Princeton University
 Edward Witten (born 1951), mathematician and physicist, fellow at the Institute for Advanced Study
 Richard L. Wright (born 1943), political leader who held a number of positions at both the state and national level
 Sarah Zelenka (born 1987), rower at the 2012 Summer Olympics
 Vladimir K. Zworykin (1888–1982), Russian-American engineer, inventor and television pioneer

Princeton in popular culture

Film
Princeton was the setting of the Academy Award-winning A Beautiful Mind about the schizophrenic mathematician John Nash. It was largely filmed in central New Jersey, including some Princeton locations.  However, many scenes of "Princeton" were actually filmed at Fordham University's Rose Hill campus in the Bronx.

The 1994 film I.Q., featuring Meg Ryan, Tim Robbins, and Walter Matthau as Albert Einstein, was also set in Princeton and was filmed in the area. It includes some geographic stretches, including Matthau looking through a telescope from the roof of "Princeton Hospital" to see Ryan and Robbins' characters kissing on the Princeton Battlefield.

Historical films which used Princeton as a setting but were not filmed there include Wilson, a 1944 biographical film about Woodrow Wilson.

In his 1989 independent feature film Stage Fright, independent filmmaker Brad Mays shot a drama class scene in the Princeton High School auditorium, using PHS students as extras. On October 18, 2013, Mays' feature documentary I Grew Up in Princeton had its premiere showing at Princeton High School. The film, described in one Princeton newspaper as a "deeply personal 'coming-of-age story' that yields perspective on the role of perception in a town that was split racially, economically and sociologically", is a portrayal of life in the venerable university town during the tumultuous period of the late sixties through the early seventies.

Scenes from the beginning of Across the Universe (2007) were filmed on the Princeton University campus.

Parts of Transformers: Revenge of the Fallen were filmed in Princeton. Megan Fox and Shia LaBeouf were filming on Princeton University campus for two days during the summer of 2008.

Scenes from the 2008 movie The Happening were filmed in Princeton.

TV and radio
The 1938 Orson Welles radio broadcast of The War of the Worlds, is set partly in nearby Grover's Mill, and includes a fictional professor from Princeton University as a main character, but the action never moves directly into Princeton.

The TV show House was set in Princeton, at the fictional Princeton-Plainsboro Teaching Hospital, and establishing shots for the hospital display the Frist Campus Center of Princeton University. The actual University Medical Center of Princeton at Plainsboro opened on May 22, 2012, exactly one day after the finale of House aired.

The 1980 television miniseries Oppenheimer is partly set in Princeton.

Literature
F. Scott Fitzgerald's literary debut, This Side of Paradise, is a loosely autobiographical story of his years at Princeton University.

Princeton University's Creative Writing program includes several nationally and internationally prominent writers, making the community a hub of contemporary literature.

Many of Richard Ford's novels are set in Haddam, New Jersey, a fictionalized Princeton.

Joyce Carol Oates' 2004 novel Take Me, Take Me With You (written pseudonymously as Lauren Kelly) is set in Princeton.

New Jersey author Judy Blume set her novel Superfudge in Princeton.

Music
All of the members of Blues Traveler, as well as Chris Barron, lead singer of the Spin Doctors, are from Princeton and were high school friends.

Points of interest

Churches
 Nassau Christian Center
 Nassau Presbyterian Church
 Princeton United Methodist Church
 Princeton University Chapel
 St Paul's Roman Catholic Church
 Stone Hill Church of Princeton
 Stony Brook Meeting House and Cemetery
 Trinity Church, Princeton
 Princeton Seventh-Day Adventist Church

Educational institutions
 Institute for Advanced Study and Institute Woods
 Princeton Theological Seminary
 Princeton University
Westminster Choir College

Museums
 Morven
 Princeton University Art Museum

Historic sites
 Albert Einstein House, located at 112 Mercer Street, was the home of Albert Einstein from 1936 until his death in 1955.
 Drumthwacket, the official residence of the governor of New Jersey, is one of only four official governor's residences in the country that is not located within its state capital.
 Jasna Polana
 Jugtown Historic District is a cluster of historic buildings around the intersection of Harrison and Nassau Street that dates to colonial times.
 King's Highway Historic District
 Kingston Mill Historic District
 Maybury Hill is the boyhood home of Joseph Hewes, who later moved to North Carolina and was a signer of the United States Declaration of Independence for that state.
 Mountain Avenue Historic District
 Nassau Club
 Nassau Hall
 Nassau Inn
 Princeton Battlefield State Park
 Princeton Battle Monument
 Princeton Cemetery
 Princeton Historic District
 Princeton Ice Company
 Tusculum
 Updike Farmstead 
 The Washington Oak
 Westland Mansion
 Witherspoon Street School for Colored Children

Parks
 The D&R Canal State Park including Turning Basin Park
 Herrontown Woods Arboretum
 Lake Carnegie
 Marquand Park
 Mountain Lakes Preserve
 Palmer Square
 Princeton Battlefield State Park

Restaurants
 Elements
 Peacock Inn

Local media
 Princeton Packet 
 Princeton Town Topics
 Planet Princeton

See also
 USS Princeton, 6 ships

References

Sources
 Clark, Ronald W. (1971). Einstein: The Life and Times. .
 Gambee, Robert (1987). Princeton. .

External links

 
 Princeton Regional Convention and Visitors Bureau
 

 
2013 establishments in New Jersey
Borough form of New Jersey government
Boroughs in Mercer County, New Jersey
Former capitals of the United States
New Jersey
Populated places established in 2013
Mergers of administrative divisions in the United States